The 1500 metres distance for women in the 2010–11 ISU Speed Skating World Cup was contested over six races on six occasions, out of a total of eight World Cup occasions for the season, with the first occasion taking place in Heerenveen, Netherlands, on 12–14 November 2010, and the final occasion also taking place in Heerenveen on 4–6 March 2011.

The previous season's runner-up, Christine Nesbitt of Canada, won the cup, while Marrit Leenstra of the Netherlands came second, and Ireen Wüst, also of the Netherlands, came third. The defending champion, Kristina Groves of Canada, ended up in 22nd place.

Top three

Race medallists

Standings
Standings as of 6 March 2011 (end of the season).

References

Women 1500
ISU